Cliff Hanger is a laserdisc video game that was released by Stern Electronics in 1983. It is an interactive movie which requires the player to press a button or move the joystick in a particular direction when prompted by the game to progress the storyline.

The game uses animation from two Lupin III films, most prominently Hayao Miyazaki's The Castle of Cagliostro (1979) as well as The Mystery of Mamo (1978); both films were in turn animated by Japanese studio TMS Entertainment. The segments from The Mystery of Mamo use the original English dub commissioned by Toho, while the segments from The Castle of Cagliostro use a dub created for the game.

A scene showing the protagonist being hanged after the player made a mistake was originally included, but an option was added to the game to turn it off.

Plot 
The game's plot is based loosely on that of The Castle of Cagliostro, and follows Cliff (Arsène Lupin III) as he attempts to rescue Clarissa (Lady Clarisse d'Cagliostro) from the evil Count Draco (in some materials called "Dreyco" and in the instruction manual "Dragoe"), who wants to marry her. Cliff is aided in his quest by Jeff (Daisuke Jigen) and Samurai (Goemon Ishikawa XIII).

Development 
The game was originally edited at Associated Audio Visual, Inc., in Evanston, Illinois.  Jack Bornoff, was the editor, Paul Rubenstein, was editorial supervisor.

Cliff Hanger uses a feedback loop to read frame details from the game laserdisc.  This prevents the laserdisc and gameplay from ever going out of sync (a common occurrence in other laserdisc games as the disc players aged).

The original version of Cliff Hanger shows an animated sequence of Cliff being hanged at the gallows immediately following the "miss" animation sequence. The sequence was taken from the opening sequence of The Mystery of Mamo (where Lupin was supposedly hanged in Transylvania), plus a later scene in the same film.  According to the instruction manual, a setting on the game cabinet's logic board would allow the individual owners/operators the option of not playing the sequence if they so chose.

Legacy 
The game was considered for inclusion on the American Blu-ray release of The Castle of Cagliostro by Discotek Media; however, when it became apparent that the original contracts for the game were lost, it was left off the release.

The television show Starcade featured a special episode where rather than playing the usual three games, the contestants played three rounds of Cliff Hanger. The winner of the show, Mark Walsh, won a Cliff Hanger cabinet.

In the film The Goonies (1985), Chunk is playing Cliff Hanger when he sees the Fratelli Brothers driving past while being chased by the police.

Cliff Hanger helped expose many Americans in the 1980s to Lupin III, Hayao Miyazaki, and Japanese anime in general, as it was released in the United States before any Lupin III or Miyazaki anime productions had officially been released theatrically or on home video.

References

External links 

Dragon's Lair Project

The Dot Eaters entry on Cliff Hanger and the laser game craze

1983 video games
Arcade video games
Arcade-only video games
Lupin the Third video games
Interactive movie video games
LaserDisc video games
Stern video games
Full motion video based games
Video games developed in the United States